WolaŻytowska.JPG

Wola Żytowska is a village located in Gmina Pabianice, Pabianice County, Łódź Voivodeship, Poland.

References

Villages in Pabianice County